Aphanotriccus is a  small genus of  passerine birds in the tyrant flycatcher family. They breed in the Caribbean lowlands and foothills of Central America.

Species
There are just two species:

These are uncommon inhabitants of mature evergreen forest and tall secondary growth, usually in dense understory vegetation on the woodland edges, along streams or in clearings.

These flycatchers are seen alone or in pairs seeking insects, especially beetles and ants, picked from the underside of foliage in flight.

Logging, conversion to banana plantations and cattle-ranch expansion have resulted in widespread forest clearance and severe fragmentation, particularly in Costa Rica and Panama. These species' small range and intolerance of forest fragmentation suggest that they are declining, although more research is needed.

References 

 Stiles and Skutch,  A guide to the birds of Costa Rica,

External links
 Black-billed flycatcher - BirdLife International

 
Bird genera
 
Taxa named by Robert Ridgway